HDMP-28 or methylnaphthidate is a piperidine based stimulant drug, closely related to methylphenidate, but with the benzene ring replaced by naphthalene. It is a potent dopamine reuptake inhibitor, with several times the potency of methylphenidate and a short duration of action, and is a structural isomer of another potent dopamine reuptake inhibitor, N,O-Dimethyl-4-(2-naphthyl)piperidine-3-carboxylate.

Most of the TMP analogs of HDMP-28 have SERT Ki values in the range >10,000 and so are selective for dopamine and noradrenaline reuptake, with little or no effect on serotonin. HDMP-28 has high affinity to SERT, and so behaves as a triple reuptake inhibitor.

D.R. = Discrimination Ratio = [3H]DA ÷ [3H]CFT.

A low D.R. = addictive, whereas a high D.R. = low propensity for self-administration.

Legality 

HDMP-28 is illegal in Switzerland as of December 2015.

See also 
 3-Bromomethylphenidate
 3,4-Dichloromethylphenidate
 BMAPN
 Ethylphenidate
 HDEP-28
 Naphthylisopropylamine
 Naphyrone
 2β-Propanoyl-3β-(2-naphthyl)-tropane (WF-23)
 Isopropylphenidate
 Propylphenidate

References 

2-Piperidinyl compounds
Dopamine reuptake inhibitors
Stimulants
Designer drugs
2-Naphthyl compounds